The Cabinet Office is a department of the UK Government responsible for supporting the prime minister and Cabinet. It is composed of various units that support Cabinet committees and which co-ordinate the delivery of government objectives via other departments. As of December 2021, it had over 10,200 staff, mostly civil servants, some of whom work in Whitehall. Staff working in the Prime Minister's Office are part of the Cabinet Office.

Responsibilities
The Cabinet Office's core functions are:
 Supporting collective government, helping to ensure the effective development, coordination and implementation of policy;
 Supporting the National Security Council and the Joint Intelligence Organisation, coordinating the government's response to crises and managing the UK's cyber security;
 Promoting efficiency and reform across government through innovation, transparency, better procurement and project management, by transforming the delivery of services, and improving the capability of the Civil Service;
 Political and constitutional reform.

The Cabinet Office has responsibility for the following at a UK national level:
 the Home Civil Service
 the Boundary Commissions
 the Independent Parliamentary Standards Authority
 the Government Commercial Function and the Government Commercial Organisation.
 the Government digital, data and technology (DDaT) function through the Government Digital Service

UK Government Procurement Policy Notes are issued in the name of the Cabinet Office, although in the past they were issued by the Crown Commercial Service (CCS). The CCS Helpdesk continues to act as the contact point for any queries.

History
The department was formed in December 1916 from the secretariat of the Committee of Imperial Defence under Sir Maurice Hankey, the first Cabinet Secretary.

Traditionally the most important part of the Cabinet Office's role was facilitating collective decision-making by the Cabinet, through running and supporting Cabinet-level committees. This is still its principal role, but since the absorption of some of the functions of the Civil Service Department in 1981 the Cabinet Office has also helped to ensure that a wide range of Ministerial priorities are taken forward across Whitehall.

It also contains miscellaneous units that do not sit well in other departments. For example:
 The Historical Section was founded in 1906 as part of the Committee for Imperial Defence and is concerned with Official Histories.
 The Joint Intelligence Committee was founded in 1936 and transferred to the department in 1957. It deals with intelligence assessments and directing the national intelligence organisations of the UK.
 The Ceremonial Branch was founded in 1937 and transferred to the department in 1981. It was originally concerned with all ceremonial functions of state, but today it handles honours and appointments.

In modern times the Cabinet Office often takes on responsibility for areas of policy which are the priority of the Government of the time. The units that administer these areas migrate in and out of the Cabinet Office as government priorities (and governments) change.

Ministers and civil servants
The Cabinet Office Ministers are as follows:

The Cabinet Office senior civil servants are as follows:

The Cabinet Office also supports the work of:
 The Leader of the House of Commons
 The Leader of the House of Lords
 The Whips Office
The Parliamentary Private Secretary to the Cabinet Office supports the work of ministers.

Committees

Cabinet committees have two key purposes:
 To relieve the burden on the Cabinet by dealing with business that does not need to be discussed at full Cabinet. Appeals to the Cabinet should be infrequent, and Ministers chairing Cabinet Committees should exercise discretion in advising the prime minister whether to allow them.
 To support the principle of collective responsibility by ensuring that, even though a question may never reach the Cabinet itself, it will be fully considered. In this way, the final judgement is sufficiently authoritative that Government as a whole can be expected to accept responsibility for it. In this sense, Cabinet Committee decisions have the same authority as Cabinet decisions.

Buildings

The main building of the Cabinet Office is at 70 Whitehall, adjacent to Downing Street. The building connects three historically distinct properties, as well as the remains of Henry VIII's 1530 tennis courts, part of the Palace of Whitehall, which can be seen within the building. The Whitehall frontage was designed by Sir John Soane and completed by Sir Charles Barry between 1845 and 1847 as the Treasury Buildings. Immediately to the west Dorset House (1700) connects the front of the building to William Kent's Treasury (1733–36), which faces out onto Horse Guards Parade. The latter is built over the site of the Cockpit, used for cock fighting in the Tudor period, and subsequently as a theatre. In the early 1960s the buildings were restored and many of the Tudor remains were exposed and repaired. Significant renovations between 2010 and 2016 converted many of the floors to open plan and created new office space. The Cabinet Office Briefing Rooms are located on this site.

The department occupies other buildings in Whitehall and the surrounding area, including part of 1 Horse Guards, as well as sites in other parts of the country.

See also
 British Civil Service
 Cabinet Office Briefing Rooms
 Prime Minister's Strategy Unit
 Social Exclusion Task Force
 United Kingdom budget

References

External links

 

 
United Kingdom
1916 establishments in the United Kingdom